Cornice Mountain, 1503 m (4931 feet), is a mountain in the Stikine Icecap area of the Boundary Ranges in northwestern British Columbia, Canada.  It is located southwest of the confluence of the Flood and Stikine Rivers.

See also
Cornice Mountain (Cambria Icefield)
Cornice Ridge

References

Boundary Ranges
Stikine Country